Nikolaos Georgantas (February 27, 1880 (OS)/March 12, 1880 (NS) – November 23, 1958) was a Greek athlete who competed mainly in the discus throw.

Biography
He was born in Steno, Arcadia.

He competed for Greece in the 1904 Summer Olympics held in St. Louis, Missouri, in the discus throw where he won the Bronze medal. He also entered the shot-put, but after his first two attempts were called fouls for throwing, he withdrew in disgust.

Two years later in Athens, in his home country of Greece, he won the gold medal in the stone throw competition at the 1906 Intercalated Games.

Georgantas was the first Greek flag bearer at the 1908 Summer Olympics in London. In his last participation at the Olympic Games he took sixth place in the discus with 33.21 metres.

References

External links

 
 
 

1880 births
1958 deaths
Greek male discus throwers
Olympic bronze medalists for Greece
Athletes (track and field) at the 1904 Summer Olympics
Athletes (track and field) at the 1906 Intercalated Games
Athletes (track and field) at the 1908 Summer Olympics
Olympic athletes of Greece
Medalists at the 1904 Summer Olympics
Medalists at the 1906 Intercalated Games
Olympic bronze medalists in athletics (track and field)
Olympic tug of war competitors of Greece
Tug of war competitors at the 1904 Summer Olympics
Sportspeople from the Peloponnese
People from Arcadia, Peloponnese